The Battery Park Underpass is a vehicular tunnel at the southernmost tip of Manhattan, New York City, near the neighborhoods of South Ferry and Battery Park City. The tunnel connects FDR Drive, which runs along the east side of Manhattan Island, with the West Side Highway (New York State Route 9A, or NY 9A), which runs along the island's west side. Opened in 1951, it was the second section of the FDR Drive to be completed. The underpass crosses beneath the Battery (formerly Battery Park) and the approach to the Brooklyn–Battery Tunnel.

History

The underpass started construction in 1949 and opened to the public on April 10, 1951. The underpass runs underneath the Battery, connecting the West Side Highway to the South Street Viaduct with two lanes of traffic in each direction. The project was completed shortly after the opening of the Brooklyn-Battery Tunnel in 1950, and provides direct access between the West Side Highway and FDR Drive.

During Hurricane Sandy, the tunnel was filled completely with seawater and required major repairs.

Plans for extension

There have been three proposals to extend the tunnel north on the FDR Drive side.
In 1971, it was suggested that the South Street Viaduct be turned into a tunnel, essentially extending the underpass north to the Brooklyn Bridge
In 2002, the Downtown Alliance, the local business improvement district, called for a 350-foot (105 m) extension to the underpass to create a plaza in front of the Battery Maritime Building. The estimated cost was $70 million.
In 2005, Mayor Michael Bloomberg also called for an extension of the underpass near the Battery Maritime Building as part of a plan to rehabilitate the South Street Viaduct.

References

External links
 FDR at NYCRoads.com

1951 establishments in New York City
Tunnels completed in 1951
Road tunnels in New York City
The Battery (Manhattan)